Parish of the Epiphany of Our Lord, commonly known as Lingayen Church and formerly Los Tres Reyes or Three Kings Parish, is an historical Catholic church and cathedral in Pangasinan in the Philippines. The church is one of the oldest in the region, founded in 1587 in the same year Saint Dominic de Guzman Parish Church (San Carlos) in San Carlos, Pangasinan was also founded. It is famous for its architecture, including a dome designed by Father Miguel Aparicio and its bell tower.

History 
The Lingayen Church was founded before the municipality of Lingayen, Pangasinan itself was founded by Spanish Augustinian missionaries in 1614. The church came under the control of the Dominicans in 1740 until replaced by Filipino priests after the Spanish were driven from the area in 1898. Under their guidance, in 1928, the church was elevated to cathedral. Along with its co-cathedral, Metropolitan Cathedral of St. John the Evangelist, it is the Roman Catholic Archdiocese of Lingayen–Dagupan. In 1933, the Columbans were invited to support the development of the cathedral and the parish.

The parish was consecrated in 1587 the same year as the Saint Dominic de Guzman Parish Church in San Carlos, Pangasinan. It was established in 1616 and originally named “Parroquia de Los Tres Reyes” in honor of the Three Kings who visited Jesus after his birth, and were also the town’s patrons but was renamed in the late 1960s because the kings are not Biblical canon. The architectural design of the parish was based on a neo-baroque type church and was designed by a Spanish Augustinian Friar/Architect, Fr. Miguel Aparicio.   Its imposing bell tower is 45 yards high and folktales often say that when the bell chimes, the people from the town always turn their heads to look at the bell tower. The action is often said in Pangasinan language as "lingawen" which means "to look back." which rooted the name of the town, Lingayen. When the Spanish forces successfully ended the Malong Revolt in 1661, the capital of the Encomienda of Pangasinan was transferred from |  Binalatongan to Lingayen, the parish became the center of Catholic churches in Pangasinan, as it turns out to be the head offices of the high-ranking clergies. By 1740, the Augustinian order transferred the parish's facilitation under the care of the Dominicans and it was interrupted due to the Philippine Revolution in 1898.

From 1900 to June 1933, the Filipino clergy took charge of facilitating the parish. On May 19, 1928, the parish was elevated to the dignity of a Cathedral through the Apostolic Constitution of Pope Pius XI bestowed with the name Diocese of Lingayen. In the early days, Lingayen came from the Diocese of Nueva Segovia; some parts of the newly elevated Diocese also came from the Archdiocese of Manila and Diocese of Tarlac and  Zambales. As Diocese, Lingayen was selected as the Episcopal Seat with Most Reverend Cesar Ma. Guerrero was consecrated as the first bishop, later succeeded by the Most Reverend Mariano A. Madriaga on May 24, 1938.

Filipino priests facilitated the parish until the  Columban missionaries from Ireland came to the province. The Columban order commenced its activities in 1933, and the first to reach the municipality was Rev. Fr. Samuel Sheehan. The works and facilitation of the parish under the Columbans are well-organized and coordinated by the impressive experiences, tactfulness, and delicate leadership of Father Sheehan. Due to the good performance of the Columban missionaries, at the request of Bishop Madriaga, the Columban Sisters came to Lingayen on August 21, 1939 for the catechetical apostolate in the public schools.

In 1941, the  war broke out when the  Japanese invaded the Philippines. On January 9 1945, the Americans landed and liberated the Lingayen Gulf. After the war, Lingayen was severely damaged, the bishop’s palace was ruined, and the parish was partially destroyed. Under the Papal Decree of Pope Pius XII, the bishop’s residence was transferred from Lingayen to Dagupan.

The Diocese of Lingayen was reconstituted into an archdiocese on February 16, 1963, encompassing only the whole civil province of Pangasinan. It was also during this time that the seat of the newly elevated archdiocese was transferred from Lingayen to Dagupan. The diocese was therefore named Archdiocese of Lingayen-Dagupan and Lingayen was known as The Three Kings Co-Cathedral. The Most Reverend Mariano A. Madriaga was promoted as the first archbishop of the Metropolitan See. The parochial towns from Tarlac and Nueva Ecija that are part of the diocese was returned to their respective civil provinces.

Upon the retirement of Archbishop Madriaga on February 7, 1973, the Most Reverend Federico Limon took over. Thus the archdiocese experienced several successions of archbishops, together with numerous remarkable religious activities, events, management, and reconstruction done to the newly elevated Lingayen Co-Cathedral Parish.

The Columban missionaries who successfully survived the war reconstructed the old bishop’s palace and turned it into Saint Columban’s College. They stayed in Lingayen for 48 years and made significant progress. When the missionaries left Lingayen, the parish was now under the care of the Filipino parishioners.

In the term of service of the First Team Ministry of our parish composed of Rev. Fr. John Palinar, Moderator, Rev. Fr. Jose Estrada, Rev. Fr. Manuel Bravo, and Rev. Fr. Victor Embuido, the parish got the name Epiphany of Our Lord Co-Cathedral Parish . The team did the change the centuries-old church bells with the new ones through donations from civic-spirited citizens here and abroad. The second Team Ministry led various church renovation projects.

Gallery

References 

Roman Catholic cathedrals in the Philippines
Roman Catholic churches in Pangasinan
Roman Catholic churches completed in 1587
16th-century Roman Catholic church buildings in the Philippines
Churches in the Roman Catholic Archdiocese of Lingayen–Dagupan